Ronkswood is a suburb of the city of Worcester, the county seat of Worcestershire, England. It is around one mile east of the city centre, centred on Newtown Road (B4636). Much of the Ronkswood housing estate was built in the late 1940s.

Housing and amenities
Medway Road and Canterbury Road are the locations of large,  modern suburban housing developments. There are two pubs in the area. Local schools include Perry Wood Primary & Nursery School (formerly Ronkswood Infant, Nursery and Junior Schools).
 
The local church, Worcester Holy Trinity and St Matthew was built in 1965, originally having a chequerboard pattern on its outside, now removed. The former Holy Trinity church was demolished in 1969.

There is also a Salvation Army Centre in Ronkswood, which opened in August 2007. In February 2006 part of the local shopping area in Lichfield Road is a designated alcohol free zone because of antisocial behaviour.

Worcestershire Royal Hospital
Ronkswood was the site of the former main hospital in Worcester. The new Worcestershire Royal Hospital is now nearer the motorway, close to Warndon Villages and leads off Charles Hastings Way. As the former hospital site has been left disused, it is common for travellers to set up camp. The site has been acquired by commercial Property Developer Robert Hitchins Ltd for the creation  of High Point  Business Park.

Transport
First Midland Red have traditionally operated the majority of bus services in Worcester, including the Ronkswood area. Diamond Bus started operations in competition with First Midland Red from 1 September 2009. First used to operate a night service to Ronkswood in 2002.

References

External links
Perry Wood Primary & Nursery School
Ronkswood Salvation Army Centre

Geography of Worcester, England